Coffins Patch is a shallow coral reef (patch reef) located within the Florida Keys National Marine Sanctuary. It lies to the southeast of Bamboo Key.  This reef lies within a Sanctuary Preservation Area (SPA).

References

 NOAA National Marine Sanctuary Maps, Florida Keys East
 NOAA website on Coffins Patch
 NOAA Navigational Chart 11453

External links
 Benthic Habitat Map

Coral reefs of the Florida Keys